Gluten exorphins are a group of opioid peptides formed during the digestion of the gluten protein. These peptides work as external regulators for gastrointestinal movement and hormonal release. The breakdown of gliadin, a polymer of wheat proteins, creates amino acids that stop the gluten epitopes from entering the immune system to activate inflammatory reactions. During this process, gluten does not fully break down, thus increasing the presence of gluten exorphins. Because of this, researchers think this is what might lead to various diseases. 

Research shows the benefits of gluten- and casein-free diets for people with diseases and disorders connected to gluten exorphins. The mechanism behind this is still unknown. There is a possibility that gluten has deleterious effects on the human digestive system. When people are more susceptible to gluten and casein allergies, the weakened intestinal lining allows gluten exorphin to flow.

Categorization
There are four known gluten exorphins with known structure:

Gluten exorphin A5 

Structure: H-Gly-Tyr-Tyr-Pro-Thr-OH
Chemical formula: C24H37N5O9
Molecular weight: 599.64 g/mol

Gluten exorphin B4 

Structure: H-Tyr-Gly-Gly-Trp-OH
Chemical formula: C24H27N5O6
Molecular weight: 481.50 g/mol

Gluten exorphin B5 

Structure: H-Tyr-Gly-Gly-Trp-Leu-OH
Chemical formula: C30H38N6O7
Molecular weight: 594.66 g/mol

Gluten exorphin C 

Structure: H-Tyr-Pro-Ile-Ser-Leu-OH
Chemical formula: C29H45N5O8
Molecular weight: 591.70 g/mol

Clinical significance 
Recent research surrounding gluten exorphins has revolved around how the peptides might play a role in various diseases and disorders.

Celiac disease 
In response to gluten, people with celiac disease will release gluten exorphins as part of the allergic immune response. Due to the weakening of intestinal walls caused by celiac disease, some of these gluten exorphins can make their way through the lining of the intestines and are then absorbed into the bloodstream.

References 

Opioid peptides
Tetrapeptides
Pentapeptides